The Emsmoon is a cargo ship that was built in 2000 as Morgenstond III. In December 2015, she collided with and demolished the bridge carrying the Ihrhove–Nieuweschans railway over the Ems.

Description
She is powered by a Wärtsilä 8R32LNE diesel engine. The engine has eight cylinders of 320mm stroke by 350mm bore. She has the IMO number 9213894.

History
Morgenstond III was built in 2000 as yard number 325 by Ferus Smit BV, Westerbroek, Groningen, Netherlands. Laid down on 29 June 1998, she was launched on 18 November 2000 and completed on 14 December 2000. She was built for C.V. Scheepvaartonderneming Morgenstond III, Siddeburen, Groningen and operated under the management Wagenborg Shipping B.V., Delfzijl, Groningen. The callsign PBAX was allocated and her port of registry was Siddeburen.

Morgenstond III was sold in 2005 to Emsmoon NTH Schiffahrts, Papenburg-Ems, Germany and was renamed Emsmoon. She was placed under the management of Marlow Ship Management, Hamburg, Germany. This was later changed to Grona Shipping GmbH & Co.KG., Leer, Germany. Her port of registry is St. John's, Antigua and Barbuda. Her MMSI number is 304877000 and the callsign V2BN3 is allocated.

The cause of the accident was reported to be miscommunication between the bridge operator and pilot on board the ship. The bridge could not be raised as a train was due, but the ship failed to stop and collided with the bridge, blocking both railway and river. The bridge was so severely damaged that it will have to be demolished. Replacement is expected to take at least nine years. Emsmoon was pulled from the wreckage of the bridge by the tug Gerd Bliede and taken to Papenburg.

References

2000 ships
Ships built in the Netherlands
Merchant ships of the Netherlands
Cargo ships of Antigua and Barbuda
Maritime incidents in 2015
Railway accidents in 2015
Railway accidents and incidents in Germany